The Frank DeLuca Hall of Fame Field is a state-of-the-art softball facility located in Stratford, Connecticut.  It is the home of the Connecticut Brakettes team of Amateur Softball Association (ASA).

External links
 Connecticut Brakettes stadium - Frank DeLuca Hall of Fame Field

Buildings and structures in Stratford, Connecticut
Sports venues in Fairfield County, Connecticut
Softball venues in the United States
1966 establishments in Connecticut
Sports venues completed in 1966